Isaiah "Ike" Thompson (November 8, 1915 – June 25, 1995) was a former member of the Ohio House of Representatives, serving the 14th district (portions of Glenville, Euclid, Bratenahl, and East Cleveland) from 1971–1990. Thompson graduated from Central High School and attended Cleveland State University. Thompson served as a vice-chairman of the Cuyahoga County Democratic Party. Thompson was a member of the Knights of Columbus and a member of St. Aloysious Roman Catholic Church. With his wife Lodeamer, he had one daughter, Arwilda Storey.

References

Democratic Party members of the Ohio House of Representatives
Cleveland State University alumni
1915 births
1995 deaths
20th-century American politicians
American Roman Catholics